Red Shoes is a 2021 South Korean television series starring Choi Myung-gil, So Yi-hyun and Park Yoon-jae. The series, directed by Park Gi-hyeon and written by Hwang Soon-young, tells the story of a daughter who seeks to take revenge on her heartless mother, who left her father and brother in search of love and success. The daily drama premiered on KBS2 on July 5 and aired on every weekday at 19:50 (KST) till December 10, 2021.

Synopsis
The series revolves around Kim Jem-ma (So Yi-hyun), a daughter who has a strong desire to take revenge on her heartless mother, who left her father and brother in search of love and success.

Choi Myung-gil portrays Min Hee-kyeong, Kim Jem-ma's cold-hearted mother, who abandons her family after reuniting with her first love. Kim Jem-ma seeks to find out the secrets related to, and to avenge, her father's death. Yoon Gi-seok (portrayed by Park Yoon-jae) does not believe in love due to his wife's betrayal, but falls in love with Kim Jem-ma. Yoon Hyeon-seok (Shin Jung-yoon) is Yoon Gi-seok's younger brother, with free soul and defiant charm.

The title of the series as explained by the writer Hwang Soon-young: "The day the main character woman was kicked out of her house by her husband, she comes out wearing the 'red shoes' that a man in the past gave her. And the last gift she left for her daughter is a necklace of red shoe accessories. If the 'red shoes' are 'desire' for the mother, it becomes 'revenge' for the daughter."

Cast

Main
 Choi Myung-gil as Min Hee-kyeong, Kim Jem-ma's mother
 She has her desires and instincts and transforms from the past when she was tied to the roles of mother and wife, leader in the shoe industry with the name 'Laura' 
 So Yi-hyun as Kim Jem-ma
Daughter of Kim Jeong-guk and Min Hee-kyeong, Min Hee-kyeong disappears one night, her father is killed in a hit and run case, she grows up as the adopted daughter of the aunt Ok-kyung next door
 Park Yoon-jae as Yoon Gi-seok
Grandson of Choi Sook-ja, representative of the fusion Korean restaurant. Afraid of love due to the betrayal of his former wife, closed the door to his heart due to the wounds of the past
 Shin Jung-yoon as Yoon Hyeon-seok, Yoon Gi-seok's younger brother, the second grandson of Choi Sook-ja 
 Jung Yoo-min as Kwon Hye-bin, Kim Jem-ma's half-sister
A gold spoon princess character, born late to CEO Kwon Hyuk-sang and Min Hee-kyung, and grew up only being cute

Supporting

People around Kim Jem-ma 
 Yang Geum-seok as Lee Kyung Hee
 Yang Seon-hee as Lee Sook
So Ok-kyung's social friend, older sister, and rival, sells coffee in the same traditional market 
 Kyeong In-seon as So Ok-kyung
 Kim Kwang-young as So Tae-gil 
A white-bearded gangster who lives with his older sister Ok-kyung
 Ji Ji-yoon as Lee Kun-wook, So Ok-kyung's son of a wealthy man.
 Ha Eun-jin as Jung Yoo-kyung
Kim Jem-ma's best friend and Lee Kun-wook's girlfriend

People around Min Hee-kyeong 
 Sunwoo Jae-duk as Kwon Hyuk-sang 
Min Hee-kyeong's former lover, current husband
 Choi Yeong-wan as Kwon Soo-yeon
Kwon Hyuk-sang's younger sister
 Ban Hyo-jung as Choi Sook-ja 
A famous big fish in the underground lending industry. Kim Jem-ma's long-lost adoptive grandmother. 
 Kim Kyu-chul as Kim Jeong-guk, Min Hee-kyung's husband  
 Hwang Dong-ju as Kwon Joo-hyeong

Others 
 Kim Yu-seok as Kwon Seok-hwan
 Park Chan-hwan as Mi Jeong
 Kim Ri-won as Ye Won
 Han In-soo as Yoon Jin-beom
 Seo Kwon-soon
 Han Chae-kyung as Go Eun-cho, Yoon Gi-seok's ex-wife, disappeared before, now reappears

Special appearance
 Park Geon-il as Jin-ho, younger brother of Kim Jem-ma

Production

Casting
So Yi-hyun was confirmed to appear in the revenge series in May 2021. She last appeared in 2016 KBS daily drama Secrets of Women. It is her comeback after five years. A script reading session was held on May 18 in KBS studio. Script writer Hwang Soon-Young has written three daily dramas, 2013 series Ruby Ring, 2014 series Two Mothers and 2015 series The Great Wives. Jung Yoo-min and director Park Gi-hyeon are working together for third time. Their previous two series are:
Unasked Family (2019) and 2020 KBS Drama Special, Season 11 episode "My Lilac". First joint script reading session was held on June 14.

Filming
On June 16, KBS released first stills of So Yi-hyun from the filming of drama. On August 19, A confirmed case of COVID-19 was reported from the filming site of the TV series. An actor, who came in contact with that person has been sent under self-quarantine.

Original soundtrack

Part 1

Part 2

Part 3

Part 4

Part 5

Part 6

Part 7

Part 8

Part 9

Part 10

Part 11

Part 12

Part 13

Part 14

Part 15

Part 16

Part 17

Part 18

Part 19

Part 20

Part 21

Part 22

Part 23

Part 24

Part 25

Part 26

Part 27

Part 28

Part 29

Part 30

Part 31

Viewership

Awards and nominations

Notes

References

External links
  
 Red Shoes at Daum 
 Red Shoes at Naver 
 
 

Korean Broadcasting System television dramas
2021 South Korean television series debuts
2021 South Korean television series endings
Korean-language television shows
South Korean melodrama television series
Television series about revenge